The Mirror of Simple Souls is an early 14th-century work of Christian mysticism by Marguerite Porete dealing with the workings of Divine Love.

Written originally in Old French at a time when Latin was the prescribed language for religious literature, it explores in poetry and prose the seven stages of 'annihilation' the Soul goes through on its path to Oneness with God through love. Enormously popular when written, it fell foul of the Church authorities, who, detecting elements of the antinomian Heresy of the Free Spirit in its vision, denounced it as "full of errors and heresies", burnt existing copies, banned its circulation, and executed Porete herself. In spite of this, the work was translated into several different languages around Europe, including English, albeit not with Porete's name attached. In fact Porete was not identified as the author until 1946. Since then it has been seen increasingly as one of the seminal works of Medieval spiritual literature and Porete, alongside Mechthild of Magdeburg and Hadewijch, can be seen as an exemplar of the love mysticism of the Beguine movement.

20th century rediscovery 
A 15th-century manuscript of an English translation by "M. N." of The Mirror was found by Mr. J. A. Herbert among a manuscript collection purchased for the British Library in 1911 and was shown to Evelyn Underhill. Other 15th-century copies were subsequently found in the Bodleian library and the library of St. John's College, Cambridge, together with a Latin version made in the late 15th century by Richard Methley of Mount Grace, Yorkshire. A printed edition was edited by Clare Kirchberger from those four manuscripts, and published by Burns Oates and Washbourne Ltd., publishers to the Holy See, in 1927, complete with Nihil Obstat and Imprimatur.

The translation by "M. N." included a number of glosses by him, and divided the text into divisions and chapters.

For the 1927 edition, the mediæval text was used but with spellings updated, and occasional words replaced accompanied by footnotes with additional glosses.

See also

Beguines
Speculum literature
Brethren of the Free Spirit
Christian mysticism
Meister Eckhart
Heilwige Bloemardinne

References

Visionary literature
Medieval French literature
1300s books
Beguines and Beghards
Christian mysticism